St. Marie Peak is a small peak (100 m) at the north end of Foyn Island, in the Possession Islands. Mapped by United States Geological Survey (USGS) from surveys and U.S. Navy air photos, 1958–63. Named by Advisory Committee on Antarctic Names (US-ACAN) for Lieutenant Commander John W. St. Marie, U.S. Navy, co-pilot on the Squadron VX-6 flight of January 18, 1958, at which time the Possession Islands and this feature were photographed.

Mountains of Victoria Land
Borchgrevink Coast